Praealticus margaritatus is a species of combtooth blenny found in the eastern central Pacific ocean, around Samoa.  This species grows to a length of  SL.

References

margaritatus
Taxa named by William Converse Kendall
Taxa named by Lewis Radcliffe
Fish described in 1912